Buku may refer to:

 Bucu, a German island fortress
 Buku, short name for Buku-Larrnggay Mulka Centre at Yirrkala, Northern Territory, Australia
 Buzhu, a legendary ancestor of the imperial Zhou dynasty

See also
 BUKU Music + Art Project